Pagea is a genus of prehistoric eurypterid classified as part of the family Stylonuridae. It contains three species, all from the Devonian (Lochkovian to Pragian); P. plotnicki from Nunavut, Canada and P. sturrocki and P. symondsii from the Old Red Sandstone of the United Kingdom. The genus is named in honor of David Page, an early worker on the fauna of the Old Red Sandstone and describer of the first Stylonurine eurypterid.

Description 
Pagea was a large stylonurid eurypterid. The third and fourth prosomal appendages bore double rows of flat spines. The prosoma was subrectangularly shaped, with the eyes located on the anterior half.

The metastoma was narrow in relation to the width of the prosoma, being half as wide as it was long. The telson was styliform, long and keeled.

See also 
 List of eurypterids

References 

Stylonuroidea
Devonian eurypterids
Eurypterids of North America
Eurypterids of Europe